{{DISPLAYTITLE:C25H40N2O6S}}
The molecular formula C25H40N2O6S (molar mass: 496.66 g/mol) may refer to:

 Eoxin D4, or 14,15-leukotriene D4
 Leukotriene D4

Molecular formulas